Édouard Edmond Lafargue (Langon 1803 – 1 February 1884 in Paris) was a French playwright.

His plays have been performed on the most important Parisian stages of the 19th century: Théâtre du Palais-Royal, Théâtre du Gymnase dramatique, Théâtre du Vaudeville, Théâtre des Variétés etc.  Quelques-unes de ses pièces ont été signées under the pen name Camille

Plays 
1825 : Le mauvais sujet, drama, with Eugène Scribe
1842 : Le Château de la Roche-noire, ou Un amour posthume, comedy in 1 act, mixed with vaudevilles, with Paul Siraudin
1845 : L'almanach des  adresses, comédie en vaudevilles in three acts, with Ferdinand de Villeneuve
1845 : L'Escadron volant de la Reine, comédie en vaudevilles in 1 act, with Dumanoir
1847 : La Cour de Biberach, comédie en vaudevilles in 1 act, with Eugène Guinot
1850 : Un fantôme, comédie en vaudevilles in 1 act, with de Villeneuve
1851 : Mme Bertrand et Mlle Raton, comédie en vaudevilles in 1 act, with Dumanoir
1852 : Mademoiselle de Navailles, comédie en vaudevilles in 1 act, with Siraudin
1853 : Le bourreau des crânes,  comédie en vaudevilles in 3 acts, preceded by a prologue, with Paul Siraudin
1853 : Un mari charmant, comédie en vaudevilles in 1 act, with Dumanoir
1854 : La marquise de Tulipano, comédie en vaudevilles in 2 acts, with Dumanoir
1854 : La Mort du pêcheur, comédie en vaudevilles in 1 act, with Siraudin
1857 : L'Homme qui a vécu, comédie en vaudevilles in 2 acts, with Dumanoir
1858 : La Balançoire, comedy in 1 act, mixed with couplets, with Dumanoir
1860 : Le Chapitre de la toilette, comedy in 1 act, with Antonin d'Avrecourt and Ernest-Georges Petitjean
1860 : Un tyran en sabots, comedy in 1 act, in prose, with Dumanoir
1861 : Le Gentilhomme pauvre, comedy in 2 acts, in prose, with Dumanoir
1862 : Le Domestique de ma femme, comédie envaudevilles in 1 act, with d'Avrecourt and Petitjean
1862 : Les Invalides du mariage, comedy in 3 acts, with Dumanoir
1863 : Trois chapeaux de femme, comédie en vaudevilles in 1 act, with Siraudin

Bibliography 
 Joseph Marie Quérard, Félix Bourquelot, Charles Louandre, La littérature française contemporaine. XIXe siècle, 1852, (p. 527)
 Édouard Feret, Personnalités & notables girondins, 1889, (p. 352)

References 

19th-century French dramatists and playwrights
People from Gironde
1803 births
1884 deaths